Michele Graglia is a model, author, fitness coach, and ultra marathon runner.  His book Ultra was published by Sperling & Kupfer in May 2017.  Originally from Taggia, Liguria, Italy, Graglia became an international model represented by Major Model Management in New York and the now defunct Irene Marie Model Management in Miami, FL, where he was initially discovered.    He currently lives in Los Angeles, California.

On July 24, 2018, Graglia completed and won the Badwater 135. He finished the race in a time of 24:51:47.

On September 15, 2018, Graglia started the ultramarathon across Chile's Atacama Desert. The translation company TransPerfect sponsored his run. Following the run, Graglia was officially certified as the new Guinness Book World Record holder for the fastest-ever crossing of Chile's Atacama Desert on foot. He accomplished the unprecedented feat in 8 days, 12 hours, and 49 minutes, the equivalent of 2 to 3 marathons per day.

On 11 October 2020, Graglia won the Moab 240 in 61 hours, 43 minutes, and 15 seconds. Graglia took the first place early on in the race and was tightly followed by fellow runner David Goggins until Graglia grew their gap during the second half of the race, at one point, close to 20 miles separated the two. Graglia would end up grabbing the first place, with an advance of almost 1 hour and a half over Goggins who would finish second.

References

External links 
Official Michele Graglia Website
Interview with Michele Graglia for UltraRunner podcast.
Michele Graglia modeling

Living people
American people of Italian descent
Male ultramarathon runners
American male models
1984 births
Italian male marathon runners